Karl Kotratschek (24 October 1914 – 4 July 1941) was an Austrian athlete. He competed in the men's triple jump at the 1936 Summer Olympics. He was killed in action during World War II.

References

External links
 

1914 births
1941 deaths
Athletes (track and field) at the 1936 Summer Olympics
Austrian male triple jumpers
Olympic athletes of Austria
Athletes from Vienna
Austrian military personnel killed in World War II